Neylandville is a town in Hunt County, Texas, United States. The population was 97 at the 2010 census, up from 56 at the 2000 census.

Geography

Neylandville is located northeast of the center of Hunt County at  (33.202797, –96.002630). Texas State Highway 224 passes through the town, leading northeast  to Commerce and southwest  to Greenville, the Hunt county seat.

Demographics

2020 census

As of the 2020 United States census, there were 67 people, 43 households, and 33 families residing in the town.

2000 census
As of the census of 2000, there were 56 people, 24 households, and 15 families residing in the town. The population density was 177.2 people per square mile (67.6/km2). There were 32 housing units at an average density of 101.2 per square mile (38.6/km2). The racial makeup of the town was 3.57% White and 96.43% African American.

There were 24 households, out of which 25.0% had children under the age of 18 living with them, 41.7% were married couples living together, 8.3% had a female householder with no husband present, and 37.5% were non-families. 33.3% of all households were made up of individuals, and 16.7% had someone living alone who was 65 years of age or older. The average household size was 2.33 and the average family size was 3.07.

In the town, the population was spread out, with 17.9% under the age of 18, 5.4% from 18 to 24, 30.4% from 25 to 44, 30.4% from 45 to 64, and 16.1% who were 65 years of age or older. The median age was 43 years. For every 100 females, there were 100.0 males. For every 100 females age 18 and over, there were 100.0 males.

The median income for a household in the town was $50,417, and the median income for a family was $52,083. Males had a median income of $23,333 versus $20,417 for females. The per capita income for the town was $21,888. There were no families and 14.6% of the population living below the poverty line, including no under eighteens and 40.0% of those over 64.

Economy
Neylandville is home to one liquor store and one beer and wine store. It is the closest town to Greenville that allows the sale of alcoholic beverages.

Education
Neylandville is served by the Commerce Independent School District.

References

Dallas–Fort Worth metroplex
Towns in Hunt County, Texas
Towns in Texas